An IGC file  (.igc extension) is a text file format used in flight recorders especially in gliders but also in paragliders in order to certify a performance (circuit performed as planned, altitude gain, duration of a flight, etc.). This format allows in particular the recording of the position (determined via the satellite navigation), the recording of the evolution of the altitude (measured by GPS or by barometric sensor) but also of additional information such as the possible ignition of an engine.

Specification for this file format is published by the International Gliding Commission of the International Aeronautical Federation.

These files can be created using specialized equipment called FAI recorder or FAI logger (Volkslogger, LXNAV Nano among others) or using certain anti-collision devices (FLARM) or using a dedicated application that can run on smartphone (XCSoar, LK8000, SeeYou Mobile ...).

These files can be viewed (GPS track and altitude in particular) using software running in the form of rich client (GPXSee for example ) or web application. Some smartphone applications also allow you to view these files (IGC Viewer & Browser on Android for example).
There are also tools to convert IGC files to tracks in GPX or KML with extension gx:Track format. They allow you to view the track made (but lose a lot of information present in the original IGC file such as the circuit declaration).

See also 
 GPX file format
 KML (Keyhole Markup Language) with extension gx:Track file format
 CSV file format

External links 
 https://www.fai.org/page/igc-free-software FREE SOFTWARE FOR IGC-APPROVED GNSS FLIGHT RECORDERS
 http://www.ukiws.uk/GFAC/documents/tech_spec_gnss.pdf Technical specification for GNSS flight recorders

Notes and references 
 https://www.fai.org/page/igc-approved-flight-recorders
 https://www.fai.org/sites/default/files/igc_fr_specification_2020-11-25_with_al6.pdf
 https://www.fai.org/sites/default/files/igc-approval_table_history_-_2021-8-22.pdf

Aviation technology
Text file formats
Open formats
Computer files